Oath Breaker is the fifth book in the Chronicles of Ancient Darkness series by Michelle Paver. There are six books in the series. Oath Breaker is illustrated by Geoff Taylor.

Plot summary
Suspecting that the last fragment of the fire opal is hidden on the Seal Islands, Torak, Renn and Bale are searching for it there. After Bale asks Torak for his permission to take Renn as his mate, which leads to Torak storming off, Bale is murdered by Thiazzi the Oak Mage, who finds and takes the fragment. Torak, guilt-ridden and remorseful since he left Bale alone, vows to avenge Bale's death. He is joined by Renn, Wolf, and Fin-Kedinn on a journey into the Deep Forest, Thiazzi's home, where the Forest Horse and Auroch Clans are at war.

On the Deep Forest, Fin-Kedinn is injured and turns back. Torak and Renn soon discover that Thiazzi is controlling the Deep Forest clans by impersonating their mages. When a forest fire takes hold, Torak and Renn are separated. Torak eventually finds his way to Thiazzi, while Renn defies the Deep Forest clan who captures her by showing them her bond with Wolf and the ravens, Rip and Rek, an ability which they do not believe a woman could have. Having been kidnapped by Thiazzi and imprisoned in a giant, hollow tree, she cuts herself free in time to avoid choking on smoke, and climbs to the top, from where she sees Torak fighting Thiazzi.

She throws a burning brand of wood to Torak, and a burning ember sets fire to Thiazzi's hair. He falls to his death as Eostra's eagle owl snatches the fire opal from the Oak Mage. As Torak is preparing to leave the deep forest, Durrain, the Red Deer Clan leader reveals to Torak that his when his mother gave birth to him, the World Spirit prophesied that her child would be the one to vanquish the Soul Eaters, and that the child would be a spirit walker, but he would be named clanless, and his mother would die. Torak and Renn then returns to the open forest.

A few days later, Wolf and his mate Darkfur show Torak and Renn their new cubs. Torak grimly starts preparing for an upcoming fight against Eostra, the Eagle Owl Mage, the last and greatest Soul Eater.

2008 British novels
Children's fantasy novels
British children's novels
Chronicles of Ancient Darkness
2008 children's books
Orion Books books